Hovorka (feminine Hovorková) is a Czech and Slovak surname. Notable people with the surname include:

 David Hovorka (born 1993), Czech footballer
 Marek Hovorka (footballer) (born 1991), Czech footballer
 Marek Hovorka (ice hockey) (born 1984), Slovak ice hockey player
 Václav Hovorka (1931–1996), Czechoslovak footballer

Czech-language surnames